Konstantinos Kozanitas (1880–1954) was a Greek gymnast. He was a member of Gymnastiki Etaireia Patron, that merged in 1923 with Panachaikos Gymnastikos syllogos to become Panachaiki Gymnastiki Enosi.

He competed in the Rope climbing event in the 1906 Intercalated Games in Athens. He finished third behind the Greek Georgios Aliprantis and the Hungarian Béla Erödy.

External links 
 
 

1880 births
1954 deaths
Greek male artistic gymnasts
Olympic gymnasts of Greece
Athletes (track and field) at the 1906 Intercalated Games
Olympic bronze medalists for Greece
Medalists at the 1906 Intercalated Games